Metropolitan Avenue was a train station along the Bushwick Branch of the Long Island Rail Road, located at Metropolitan Avenue near Woodward Avenue in Maspeth, Queens. Its opening date is unknown but it closed with the end of passenger service on the Bushwick Branch on May 13, 1924 and was removed afterwards. Right next to the station is one of the busiest level crossings in New York City.

See also
Bushwick Branch
Long Island Rail Road

References

Former Long Island Rail Road stations in New York City
Railway stations closed in 1924
Railway stations in Queens, New York